Paul Schiff Berman (born February 12, 1966) is an American lawyer and the Walter S. Cox Professor of Law at The George Washington University School of Law.  He has held several other positions at the University including Vice Provost for Online Education and Academic Innovation and Dean of the School of Law.

Education 
Berman earned his Bachelor of Arts, summa cum laude, from Princeton University in 1988 and his Juris Doctor in 1995 from New York University School of Law where he served as Managing Editor of the New York University Law Review and received the University Graduation Prize for the graduating law student with the highest cumulative grade point average.

Career 
Paul Schiff Berman, the Walter S. Cox Professor of Law at The George Washington University Law School, is one of the world’s foremost theorists on the effect of globalization on the interactions among legal systems. He is the author of over sixty scholarly works, including Global Legal Pluralism: A Jurisprudence of Law Beyond Borders, published by Cambridge University Press in 2012. He is also the author of The Oxford Handbook of Global Legal Pluralism, published in 2020.  He was among the first legal scholars to focus on legal issues regarding online activity, and he is co-author of one of the leading casebooks in the field. 

From 2013 to 2016, Berman served as George Washington University's Vice Provost for Online Education and Academic Innovation. He served as dean of The George Washington University Law School and Robert Kramer Research Professor of Law from 2011 to 2013. He was honored for his work at a portrait unveiling ceremony at the University in 2016, at which law school staff, faculty, alumni, and students praised his deanship. 

Prior to this, Berman served as dean of the Sandra Day O'Connor College of Law of Arizona State University from 2008 to 2011.  He was a professor at the University of Connecticut School of Law, where he taught from 1997 to 2008.  His scholarship focuses on the multiple effects of globalization on legal systems.

He served as law clerk to then-Chief Judge Harry T. Edwards, of the United States Court of Appeals for the District of Columbia Circuit, and for Associate Justice Ruth Bader Ginsburg, of the United States Supreme Court.  Prior to entering law, Berman was, from 1988 to 2005, Artistic Director of Spin Theater, a theater company based in New York City.  He was also Administrative Director of The Wooster Group and was the founding Administrator for Richard Foreman's Ontological-Hysteric Theatre at Saint Mark's Church in the East Village.

Personal life 
Berman is married to Laura A. Dickinson since 2000, in a ceremony performed by Ruth Bader Ginsburg.

Selected publications

Articles

Books and book chapters

See also 
 List of law clerks of the Supreme Court of the United States (Seat 6)

References

External links

 Paul Schiff Berman at The George Washington University
Twitter @pschiffberman

University of Connecticut faculty
Law clerks of the Supreme Court of the United States
1966 births
Living people
George Washington University faculty
George Washington University deans
Jewish American attorneys
Conflict of laws scholars